White Building is a 2021 Cambodian drama film directed by Kavich Neang. It was selected as the Cambodian entry for the Best International Feature Film at the 94th Academy Awards. The film was also nominated for the New Talent Award at the Hong Kong Asian Film Festival 2021.

Plot
The lives of three friends are upended when the artist enclave where they reside, the White Building, is scheduled to be demolished.

Cast
 Piseth Chhun
 Chinnaro Soem

See also
 List of submissions to the 94th Academy Awards for Best International Feature Film
 List of Cambodian submissions for the Academy Award for Best International Feature Film

References

External links
 

2021 films
2021 drama films
Cambodian drama films
Khmer-language films